Wainuia fallai is a species of air-breathing predatory land snail, a terrestrial pulmonate gastropod mollusc in the family Rhytididae.

References
 Powell A W B, New Zealand Mollusca, William Collins Publishers Ltd, Auckland, New Zealand 1979 

Gastropods of New Zealand
Rhytididae
Gastropods described in 1946
Taxa named by Arthur William Baden Powell